Charu Deva Shastri (चारुदेवशास्त्री) [1896 - 1987] was a Sanskrit grammarian. He is also the father of the Sanskrit scholar Satya Vrat Shastri.

Works
 Panini Reinterpreted (Translation of Vyakaranacandrodaya )
 उपसर्गार्थचन्द्रिका
 Vyakaranacandrodaya
 Vyākaraṇa-mahābhāṣya (prathama āhṛakatraya) kā Hindī anuvāda tathā vivaraṇa.
 शब्दापशब्दविवेक
 वाक्यमुक्तावली
 Gandhicharita

References

1896 births
Sanskrit grammarians
Year of death missing
Indian Sanskrit scholars